Sadenia "Eddi" Reader MBE (born 29 August 1959) is a Scottish singer-songwriter, known for her work as frontwoman of Fairground Attraction and for an enduring solo career. She is the recipient of three BRIT Awards. In 2003, she showcased the works of Scotland's national poet, Robert Burns.

Early career
Reader was born in Glasgow, Scotland, the daughter of a welder, and the eldest of seven children (her brother, Francis, is vocalist with the band The Trash Can Sinatras and her grandmother, Sadie Smith, was a leading Scottish footballer). She was nicknamed Edna by her parents. Living at first in the district of Anderston, in a tenement slum demolished in 1965, the young Reader family moved to a two-bedroomed flat in the estate of Arden.

In 1976, due to overcrowding, the family was re-housed 25 miles from Glasgow, in a council development in Irvine, North Ayrshire. However, Reader returned to Glasgow (where she lived with her grandmother in Pollok) to finish her compulsory schooling. She began playing the guitar at the age of ten, and started her musical career busking, first in Glasgow's Sauchiehall Street, then in the early 1980s in London and around Europe (where she also worked with circus and performance artists).

Back in Scotland, while finding factory work in Irvine and working part-time in Sirocco Recording Studio in Kilmarnock, she answered an advert in the music press and travelled to London to audition and join the post-punk band Gang of Four, who needed a backing singer for their appearance on British television music show The Old Grey Whistle Test and for their UK tour. This led to her first US tour with the band. After returning to the UK and leaving the band, she started working as a session vocalist in London, picking up work singing jingles for radio advertisements and singing with such acts as Eurythmics, The Waterboys, Billy MacKenzie, John Foxx and Alison Moyet.

Fairground Attraction

In 1984, Reader returned to the UK from Paris, where she had been working as a singer for the composer Vladimir Cosma. Through her contact with the brass section session players The Kick Horns in London, she signed a contract with EMI, and recorded two singles with the disco group Outbar Squeek. Around the same time, she met and asked Mark E. Nevin, a guitarist and songwriter from the band Jane Aire and the Belvederes to write for her and they recorded two songs as 'The Academy of Fine Popular Music'.  They subsequently formed Fairground Attraction, together with Simon Edwards (guitarrón – a Mexican acoustic bass guitar) and Roy Dodds (drums & percussion). In 1988 the band signed to RCA/BMG records and released their first single, "Perfect", which became a UK number one, winning best single at the 1989 BRIT Awards.  Their first album, The First of a Million Kisses, was also a success, reaching number two in the UK Albums Chart, and winning best album at the 1989 Brits.

This success was short-lived, however. In November 1989, after a break, during which Reader had her first child, Charlie, with her French-Algerian partner Milou, arguments arose within the group, and Nevin abandoned a recording session for the second album, which eventually led to the splitting of the band. A makeshift second album, a collection of B-sides and live tracks, Ay Fond Kiss, was rushed out the following year.

Solo career

Mirmama and Eddi Reader (1992–1994)
Reader returned to Scotland, but before she embarked on her solo career she took a temporary detour into acting. She played Jolene Jowett, a singer and accordionist, in John Byrne's Your Cheatin' Heart, a comedy-drama series for BBC Television, set in the country music scene in Scotland. In 1993 Reader was the presenter of BBC Scotland's No Stilettos, a music performance programme recorded in Glasgow. Her other acting credits include playing the part of Joy 3 from the Michael Boyd (artistic director of the Royal Shakespeare Company) production of Janice Galloway's The Trick Is to Keep Breathing. This was a BBC Radio 4 production in 1996 and also a Tron Theatre production the same year.

Returning to London, Reader worked on new material with a backing band calling itself The Patron Saints of Imperfection (made up of Roy Dodds, Neill and Calum MacColl, and Phil Steriopoulos). This became her first solo album, recorded for RCA Records: 1992's Mirmama. She met Geoff Travis who signed her to Warner Brothers subsidiary label, Blanco Y Negro. The managing director Rob Dickens executively produced her second solo album Eddi Reader (1994), which won her the "Best female singer" BRIT Award that year, followed by Candyfloss and Medicine (1996), and Angels & Electricity (1998). She parted from Warner Brothers and continued her work on Geoff Travis' Rough Trade label when she recorded  Simple Soul (2001) and Driftwood (2002) – a "homegrown" release of songs recorded during the Simple Soul sessions. During this time, Reader also recorded the song "Ocean Love" for the soundtrack of the animated Danish film Help! I'm a Fish (2001). Reader also contributed vocals to one of Big Country's final singles before Stuart Adamson's death, "Fragile Thing".

Sings the Songs of Robert Burns (1994–2007)

Reader continued to tour (England, Scotland, Japan, Australia, Spain, the United States, and Ireland). In 2003, she recorded her album of material by Robert Burns, with the Royal Scottish National Orchestra, leading to good reviews and an international resurgence in interest in Scotland's "bard".

In 2004, Reader sang at the re-opening of the new Scottish Parliament building, where she was presented to Queen Elizabeth II. She has described the experience: "I was honoured to sing at the opening of the parliament although I almost didn’t get to. I wanted to sing ‘Auld Lang Syne' as I thought that would have been perfect for the politicians with everyone shaking hands but they wanted me to sing it in 'F’ key and that wasn't the key for me so I told them I wasn't doing it. It was only at the last minute that I eventually agreed."

She spent April 2006 touring Australia with Boo Hewerdine and Alan Kelly, following the release of St Clare's Night Out: Live at The Basement, with Australian acts such as David Hosking invited to open the concerts.

Reader's eighth studio album, Peacetime, was released in 2007 on the Rough Trade record label. Produced by fellow Scottish folk musician, John McCusker, the album features a few Burns composed songs, alongside original material with long-time collaborator Boo Hewerdine and The Trash Can Sinatras' John Douglas.

Love Is the Way (2008–2010)

In spring 2008, Reader was a special guest at the Hotel Cafe Tour hosted by Tom McRae. In 2009, she performed in period-drama Me and Orson Welles, directed by Richard Linklater and starring Zac Efron, Christian McKay and Claire Danes. Reader performed re-arranged 1930s standards, with Jools Holland, with whom she had previously collaborated on the single "Waiting Game".

To commemorate the 250th anniversary of Robert Burns' birth, Reader released The Songs of Robert Burns Deluxe Edition in January 2009. The new release brought together the original Burns album with seven additional songs, two from the original 2003 sessions ("Green Grow the Rashes O", "Of A' the Airts"), three from 2007's Peacetime ("Ye banks and Braes", "Aye Waukin O" and "Leezie Lindsay") the unreleased "Dainty Davie", also from that session, and a brand new recording, "Comin' Thro the Rye/Dram Behind the Curtain". The new album was promoted, like the original release, with two sold-out shows at the annual Celtic Connections festival in Glasgow.

In 2009 Reader released her ninth studio album, Love is the Way, which was self-produced. In a special arrangement with record label Rough Trade she sold an exclusive, pre-released and minimally-packaged version of the disc on her 19-date autumn 2008 UK tour.

Vagabond and recent work (2010–present)

In early 2010, Reader appeared on the Irish language album Ceol '10 Súil Siar, singing an Irish language version of the Fairground Attraction song "Perfect" called "Foirfe". In December she released a live album on her own label and sold exclusively via her online store, Live in Japan. Recorded from the sound desk at her Japan shows in September 2009, it was mastered and mixed by Mark Freegard who had worked on the 2009 album Love is the Way.

Personal life
In 2013, Reader married John Douglas, a songwriter and member of The Trashcan Sinatras.

Politics

Reader has been an advocate for the Yes Scotland movement, campaigning for a Yes vote in the referendum for Scottish independence from the United Kingdom. Her 2013 appearance on the British TV programme Question Time was publicly criticised, with one viewer threatening on Twitter to cut her tongue out.
Reader has said she is "an egalitarian who believes in the autonomy of small nations, it's unconscionable that those who call people 'nationalists' for wanting their country to manage its own wealth, do not recognise the 'nationalistic' choice of supporting a 'BRITISH nation'".
Reader said that, in reprisal for her advocacy for Scottish independence, Lord David Steel said in a debate on Scottish independence in the House of Lords that Reader's work on Robert Burns was "murdering Burns' simple melodies".  Reader also said that the newspaper The Scotsman, in reprisal for Reader choosing to advocate a Yes vote, had published a story mischaracterising her political views and misrepresenting her great-uncle as a Nazi and leader in the Irish Republican Army, stating: "there’s people out there in Scotland, especially in the Press, and especially at The Scotsman — which is a very wrong name for that paper, because they don’t believe in Scotland at all; they believe in London management — who believe that Scots do not deserve the vote. I don’t want to be in that team." She issued a formal appeal to the Press Complaints Commission (PCC), saying that: "The article was trying to portray ALL people wanting to have Scots running Scotland and independence voters as having links with the early Fascists. The journalist scrapped around and tried to attach my great-uncle, who supported independence, to a 'Nazi' group and a terrorist organisation, creating hateful responses and threats to my family." The PCC ruled in May 2013 that the image in the story, accompanied by the headline ‘Klan Alba’, did not breach the Editor’s Code of Practice.

Reader is writing a book for publication about her great-uncle Seamus (or James) Reader, based on his extensive diaries. He was head of the Scottish Brigade of the Irish Republican Brotherhood, when the Irish War of Independence broke out in 1919, later becoming a founder of the abortive Scottish Republican Army, which attempted to replicate the Irish struggle in Scotland between the wars. On Facebook, she posted that he: "was in command of 4,000 Scots involved in the Irish Rising build-up and the Irish war against The British state. In telling the story I felt my ancestor was passing the baton to me to tell the truthful story of this time".

Awards
The Robert Burns project saw Reader awarded an MBE for outstanding contributions to the arts in the New Year's honours list of 2006.

In May 2007, she was awarded an honorary doctorate from the University of Strathclyde. Later that year she was recognised for her contributions to music and to the education and encouragement of young musicians with an honorary doctorate and a Doctor of Letters from Glasgow Caledonian University. In June 2008 she received another doctorate for her musical work, this time from the University of Stirling, and in 2013 she received an honorary doctor of music award from the University of Edinburgh.
{| class=wikitable
|-
! Year !! Awards !! Work !! Category !! Result
|-
|rowspan=2| 1989
|rowspan=2|Brit Awards
|"Perfect"
|Best British Single
|
|-
|The First of a Million Kisses
|Best British Album
|
|-
| rowspan=3|1995
| Ivor Novello Awards
| "Patience of Angels"
| Best Song Musically & Lyrically 
| 
|-
| Ivor Novello Awards
| "Dear John"
| Best Song Musically & Lyrically 
| 
|-
| rowspan=2|Brit Awards
| rowspan=2|Herself
| rowspan=2|Best British Female
| 
|-
| 1997
|

Discography

Albums
{| class="wikitable plainrowheaders" style="text-align:center;"
|+ List of albums, with selected chart positions and certifications
! scope="col" rowspan="2" style="width:16em;"| Title
! scope="col" rowspan="2"| Details
! scope="col" colspan="1"| Peak chart positions
! scope="col" rowspan="2" style="width:10em;"| Certifications
|-
! scope="col" style="width:3em;font-size:85%;"| UK
|-
!scope="row"|Mirmama
| 
 Released: 12 October 1992
 Label: RCA
| 34
|
|-
!scope="row"|Eddi Reader
|
 Released: 20 June 1994
 Label: Blanco y Negro
| 4
|
 BPI: Gold
|-
!scope="row"|Candyfloss and Medicine
|
 Released: 8 July 1996
 Label: Blanco y Negro
| 24
|
|-
!scope="row"|Angels & Electricity
|
 Released: 11 May 1998
 Label: Blanco y Negro
| 49
|
|-
!scope="row"|Simple Soul
|
 Released: 9 January 2001
 Label: Rough Trade
| 92
|

|-
!scope="row"|Driftwood
|
 Released: 8 October 2001
 Label: Rough Trade
| —
|
|-
!scope="row"|Sings the Songs of Robert Burns
|
 Released: 12 May 2003
 Label: Rough Trade
| 86
|
 BPI: Silver
|-
!scope="row"|Peacetime
|
 Released: 29 January 2007
 Label: Rough Trade
| 93
|
|-
!scope="row"|Love Is the Way
|
 Released: 13 April 2009
 Label: Rough Trade
| 109
|
|-
!scope="row"|Vagabond
|
 Released: 13 April 2009
 Label: Reveal
| 93
|
|-
!scope="row"|Cavalier
|
 Released: 28 September 2018
 Label: Reveal
| —
|
|-
!scope="row"|Light Is In The Horizon
|
 Released: 1 April 2022
 Label: Vertical Records
| —
|

Singles
{| class="wikitable plainrowheaders" style="text-align:center;"
|-
! scope="col" rowspan="2"  style="width:17em;"| Title
! scope="col" rowspan="2"  style="width:1em;"| Year
! scope="col" colspan="1"| Peak chart positions
! scope="col" rowspan="2" | Album
|-
! scope="col" style="width:3em;font-size:85%;"| UK
|-
!scope="row"|"All Or Nothing"
| 1991
| —
| rowspan=2|Mirmama
|-
!scope="row"|"What You Do With What You've Got"
| 1992
| —
|-
!scope="row"| "Patience of Angels"
| rowspan=3|1994
| 33
| rowspan=3|Eddi Reader
|-
!scope="row"|"Joke (I'm Laughing)"
| 42
|-
!scope="row"| "Dear John"
| 48
|-
!scope="row"|"Nobody Lives Without Love"
| 1995
| 84
| Batman Forever
|-
!scope="row"|"Town Without Pity"
| rowspan=3|1996
| 26
| rowspan=2|Candyfloss and Medicine
|-
!scope="row"|"Medicine"
| 100
|-
!scope="row"|"Waiting Game" (with Jools Holland)
| —
| Sex & Jazz & Rock & Roll
|-
!scope="row"|"Prayer Wheel"
| 1998
| —
| Angels & Electricity
|-
!scope="row"|"Fragile Thing" (with Big Country)
| rowspan=2|1999
| 69
| Driving to Damascus
|-
!scope="row"|"Usual Things" (with Little Tempo & Linton Kwesi Johnson)
| —
| 
|-
!scope="row"|"The Girl Who Fell in Love with the Moon"
| rowspan=2|2001
| —
| rowspan=2|Simple Soul
|-
!scope="row"|"Prodigal Daughter"/"Simple Soul"
| —
|-
!scope="row"|"Holiday"
| rowspan=2|2002
| —
| Driftwood
|-
!scope="row"|"May You Never" (with David Knopfler)
| —
| Wishbones
|-
!scope="row"|"Auld Lang Syne"/"Wild Mountainside"
| rowspan=2|2003
| —
| rowspan=2|Sings the Songs of Robert Burns
|-
!scope="row"|"My Love Is Like a Red, Red Rose"/"Jamie Come Try Me"
| —
|-
!scope="row"|"Muddy Water"
| 2007
| —
| Peacetime
|-
!scope="row"|"Roses"
| rowspan=2|2009
| —
| rowspan=2|Love Is the Way
|-
!scope="row"|"Dragonflies"
| —
|-
!scope="row"|"Baby's Boat"
| 2013
| —
| rowspan=2|Vagabond
|-
!scope="row"|"Back The Dogs (Dancing Down Rock)" 
| 2014
| —
|-
!scope="row"|"Starlight"
| 2018
| —
| Cavalier
|-
| colspan="4" style="font-size:90%" | "—" denotes an album that did not chart or was not released in that territory.

Live albums
 Eddi Reader Live (2001)
 Eddi Reader Live: Edinburgh (2003)
 Eddi Reader Live: Newcastle (2003)
 Eddi Reader Live: Leeds (2003)
 Eddi Reader Live: London (2003)
 St Clare's Night Out: Live at The Basement (2006)
 Port Fairy Folk Festival (2008)
 Live in Japan (2010)

Fairground Attraction
 The First of a Million Kisses (1988)
 Ay Fond Kiss (1990)
 Kawasaki – Live in Japan 02.07.89 (2003)
 The Very Best of Fairground Attraction (2004)

Film soundtracks
 Batman Forever: Music from the Motion Picture (1995)
 "Nobody Lives Without Love"
 Bed of Roses (1996)
 "The Right Place"
 Love & Sex (2000)
 "Honeychild"
 My First Mister (2001)
 "Bell, Book and Candle" (1999)

Collections
 The Blanco Y Negro Years (2015)
 The Best Of Eddi Reader (2016)

References

External links

 Official website
 Video of 3 tracks from the Auld Lang Syne concert on BBC's Celtic Connections site – live performance – January 2009
 
 
 

1959 births
Living people
Brit Award winners
Members of the Order of the British Empire
Musicians from Glasgow
21st-century Scottish women singers
Blanco y Negro Records artists
RCA Records artists
Rough Trade Records artists
Scottish buskers
Scottish singer-songwriters
20th-century Scottish women singers